Republican Left of Catalonia–Catalonia Yes (ERC–CatSí) is a  Catalan pro-independence electoral alliance. The alliance is formed by Republican Left of Catalonia, Catalonia Yes and independents, and in the 2015 and 2016 Spanish general elections it was led by Gabriel Rufián.

For general elections, the alliance has been discontinued in favour of Republican Left of Catalonia–Sovereigntists.

History
The alliance was originally formed on 8 October 2011 to contest the 2011 Spanish general election by Republican Left of Catalonia (ERC), Catalonia Yes (CatSí) and Independence Rally (RI.cat), after talks with Catalan Solidarity for Independence (SI) to join the coalition failed to materialize. The alliance with RI.cat would be discontinued ahead of the 2012 Catalan regional election, as the party would support Artur Mas's Democratic Convergence of Catalonia (CDC) list, then sign a collaboration agreement with CDC in March 2014 to run together in subsequent elections. The ERC–CatSí alliance would be temporally discontinued for the 2015 Catalan regional election, as ERC joined the Junts pel Sí list together with CDC and other parties, but it would be re-established ahead of the 2015 and 2016 Spanish general elections with Gabriel Rufián as its leading candidate.

The alliance was maintained for the 2017 regional election, this time joined by Democrats of Catalonia (DC) and Left Movement (MES).

Composition

Electoral performance

Parliament of Catalonia

Cortes Generales

Nationwide

Regional breakdown

Notes

References

Catalan nationalist parties
Political parties established in 2011
Political parties in Catalonia
Political party alliances in Spain
Republican Left of Catalonia
Social democratic parties in Spain
2011 establishments in Catalonia